Football Club Nyva Buzova is a Ukrainian football team from Buzova, Bucha Raion.

History
The club traces its heritage when a football team was created at the Soviet farm Buzivsky by local engineer Vasyl Kryzhevsky who worked as a sports instructor on voluntary basis. The created team was part of the Kolos sports society. It participated in competitions irregularly with the longest pause between 2009 and 2017 due to reconstruction of the local stadium. In 2005 and 2006 Buzova was represented by another club Hran that became the 2006 AAFU League finalist.

The Nyva Buzova was revamped in 2019 by Oktay Efendiyev, on efforts of whom the club received own training camp and football academy. The club also invited local manager Serhiy Karpenko who led FC Avanhard Bziv to regional championship title three years in a row and won the Ukrainian Amateur Cup.

In 2020 the club made its debut in the Ukrainian Amateur Cup and in 2021 entered the national amateur competitions finishing at the top of its group.

Players

Current squad

League and cup history
{|class="wikitable"
|-bgcolor="#efefef"
! Season
! Div.
! Pos.
! Pl.
! W
! D
! L
! GS
! GA
! P
!Domestic Cup
!colspan=2|Europe
!Notes
|-
|align=center|2021–22
|align=center|4th Group 2
|align=center|1
|align=center|9
|align=center|8
|align=center|1
|align=center|0
|align=center|23
|align=center|4
|align=center|25
|align=center|
|align=center|
|align=center|
|align=center|
|-
|align=center|2022–23
|align=center|3rd
|align=center|
|align=center|
|align=center|
|align=center|
|align=center|
|align=center|
|align=center|
|align=center|
|align=center|
|align=center|
|align=center|
|align=center|
|}

Honours
Ukrainian Football Amateur League
   Winners (1): 2021–22

See also
 FC Hran Buzova

References

 
Ukrainian Second League clubs
Nyva Buzova
Association football clubs established in 1980
1980 establishments in Ukraine
Sport in Bucha Raion
Agrarian association football clubs in Ukraine